≤

Here is a detailed discography for American country music artist Ray Price.

Studio albums

1950s – 1960s

1970s

1980s

1990s – 2010s

Christmas albums

Collaborations

Compilation albums

Singles

1950s

1960s

1970s

1980s – 1990s

Other singles

Collaborations

Guest singles

Christmas singles

Charted B-sides

References

Price, Ray
Discographies of American artists